Hendrella sinensis is a species of tephritid or fruit flies in the genus Hendrella of the family Tephritidae.

Distribution
China.

References

Tephritinae
Insects described in 1996
Diptera of Asia